The following is a list of United States aerial victories of the Vietnam War. While U.S. sources claimed 195 North Vietnamese Vietnam People's Air Force aircraft were shot down in air to air combat, the North Vietnamese claim that only 134 aircraft were lost.

Key statistics extrapolated
The most successful:
 USAF squadron was the 555th TFS with 36 kills
 US Navy squadron was VF-96 with 10 kills
 Aircraft was the F-4 Phantom with 147 kills
 Weapons were the AIM-7 and AIM-9 both tied with 58 kills each, although many AIM-9 were AIM-9/20mm shared kills
 day was 10 May 1972 with 11 kills (7 MiG-17s and 4 MiG-21s)
 month was May 1972 with 28 kills

See also
 Aircraft losses of the Vietnam War
 List of Vietnam War flying aces

References

aerial victories
aerial victories